Glassville is a community in the Canadian province of New Brunswick located mainly at the intersection of Route 107 and Route 580. It is situated in Aberdeen, a parish of Carleton County.

History

The community takes its name from Charles Gordon Glass, a minister who led his Scottish followers to the area in 1861.

See also
List of communities in New Brunswick

References

Communities in Carleton County, New Brunswick
Designated places in New Brunswick
Local service districts of Carleton County, New Brunswick